One, Two, Three is a 1961 American political comedy film directed by Billy Wilder, and written by Wilder and I. A. L. Diamond. It is based on the 1929 Hungarian one-act play Egy, kettő, három by Ferenc Molnár, with a "plot borrowed partly from" Ninotchka, a 1939 film co-written by Wilder.  The film stars James Cagney, Horst Buchholz, Liselotte Pulver, Pamela Tiffin, Arlene Francis, Leon Askin and Howard St. John. It would be Cagney's last film appearance until Ragtime in 1981, 20 years later.

The film is primarily set in West Berlin during the Cold War, but before the construction of the Berlin Wall, and politics is predominant in the premise. The film is known for its quick pace.

Plot
C.R. "Mac" MacNamara is a high-ranking executive in the Coca-Cola Company, assigned to West Berlin after a business fiasco a few years earlier in the Middle East (about which he is still bitter). While based in West Germany for now, Mac is angling to become head of Western European Coca-Cola Operations, based in London. After working on an arrangement to introduce Coke into the Soviet Union, Mac receives a call from his boss, W.P. Hazeltine, at Coca-Cola headquarters in Atlanta. Scarlett Hazeltine, the boss's hot-blooded but slightly dim 17-year-old socialite daughter, is coming to West Berlin. Mac is assigned the unenviable task of taking care of this young whirlwind.

An expected two-week stay develops into two months, and Mac discovers just why Scarlett is so enamored of West Berlin: she surprises him by announcing that she's married to Otto Piffl, a young East German Communist with ardent anti-capitalistic views. When the Southern belle is confronted about her foolishness in the matter of helping him blow up anti-American "Yankee Go Home" balloons (how the couple met) she simply replies with, "Why, that ain't anti-American, it's anti-Yankee... And where I come from, everybody's against the Yankees ..."

Mac tries to come to terms with the fact that he let his boss's daughter marry a Communist and learns the horrible truth: the couple are bound for Moscow to make a new life for themselves ("They've assigned us a magnificent apartment, just a short walk from the bathroom!"). Since Hazeltine and his wife are coming to Berlin to collect their daughter the very next day, this is obviously a disaster of monumental proportions, and Mac deals with it as any good capitalist would — by framing the young Communist firebrand and having him picked up by the East German police, using all his wiles, as well as his sexy secretary Fräulein Ingeborg, to get his way. After Otto is forced to listen endlessly to a cover of the song "Itsy Bitsy Teenie Weenie Yellow Polka Dot Bikini" during interrogation, which was intentionally badly distorted during playback, he cracks and signs a confession that he is an American spy.

Under pressure from his stern and disapproving wife Phyllis (who wants to take her family back to live in the US), and with the revelation that Scarlett is pregnant, Mac sets out to bring Otto back with the help of his new Soviet business associates. With the boss on the way, he finds that his only chance is to turn Otto into a son-in-law in good standing — which means, among other things, making him a capitalist with an aristocratic pedigree (albeit contrived by adoption).

Mac arranges to have Otto adopted by an impoverished count, who now works as a washroom attendant and includes a photo of the family castle with the price of adoption (destroyed in the 17th century by the Ottoman Turks). Scarlett is dubious that her father will be fooled by the ruse, but is reassured that her baby will now be part of a long line of bleeders, which will please her snobbish mother. In a frenetic race against time and the arrival of the Hazeltines' plane, Mac outfits Otto in complete paraphernalia befitting his new aristocratic status, while Otto rails against being forced to join the detested bourgeoisie (his Communist Party membership is paid up through the year). Meanwhile, Scarlett and Mac coach Otto on how to speak to her conservative Southern father ("The Civil War was a draw...").

In the end, the Hazeltines approve of their new son-in-law, upon which Mac learns from Hazeltine that Otto will be named the new head of Western European Operations, with Mac getting a promotion to VP of Procurement back in Atlanta. Mac reconciles with his family at the airport, and to celebrate his promotion, buys them Cokes. After handing out the bottles, he discovers that the Coke machine actually has been stocked with Pepsi-Cola.

Cast

Production

Cagney decided to take the role primarily because it was to be shot in Germany: while growing up in Manhattan's Yorkville neighborhood, he had had fond memories of the area, which was "teeming with German immigrants."  Horst Buchholz was a young European actor who had recently finished The Magnificent Seven with Yul Brynner, Eli Wallach and Steve McQueen; during the production, he became the only actor that Cagney ever openly disliked:

I got riled at S.Z. Sakall ... in Yankee Doodle Dandy for trying to steal a scene, but he was an incorrigible old ham who was quietly and respectfully put in his place by Michael Curtiz. No harm in the old boy. But this Horst Buchholz character I truly loathed. Had he kept on with his little scene-stealing didoes, I would have been forced to knock him on his ass, which I would have very much enjoyed doing.

Wilder was filming in Berlin the morning the Berlin Wall went up, forcing the crew to move to Munich. During principal photography, Wilder received a call from Joan Crawford, recently appointed to the board of directors of Pepsi-Cola following her husband Alfred Steele's death.  In response to Crawford's protests over the use of the Coca-Cola brand in the film, Wilder scattered some references to Pepsi, including the final scene. Some scenes were shot at Bavaria Film Studios.

The theatrical release poster for the film, with a woman holding three balloons, was designed by Saul Bass. The Bass designed poster that Wilder originally intended for the film's release featured a United States style flag sticking out of a Coca-Cola-style bottle. The poster had to be replaced, however, when Coca-Cola threatened legal action against United Artists for copyright infringement.

Soundtrack
Aram Khachaturian's lively "Sabre Dance" marks the moments when Mac moves into energetic action and is also played during the opening credits.

Release
When the movie opened, it came with a spoken preface by Cagney, added by Wilder:

On Sunday, August 13th, 1961, the eyes of America were on the nation's capital, where Roger Maris was hitting home runs #44 and 45 against the Senators. On that same day, without any warning, the East German Communists sealed off the border between East and West Berlin. I only mention this to show the kind of people we're dealing with—real shifty.

Reception

Critical response
Critic Bosley Crowther applauded the work of Cagney and wrote,

With all due respect for all the others, all of whom are very good—Pamela Tiffin, a new young beauty, as Scarlett; Horst Buchholz as the East Berlin boy, Lilo Pulver as a German secretary, Leon Askin as a Communist stooge and several more—the burden is carried by Mr. Cagney, who is a good 50 per cent of the show. He has seldom worked so hard in any picture or had such a browbeating ball. His fellow is a free-wheeling rascal. His wife (Arlene Francis) hates his guts. He knows all the ways of beating the rackets and has no compunctions about their use. He is brutishly bold and brassy, wildly ingenious and glib. Mr. Cagney makes you mistrust him—but he sure makes you laugh with him.  And that's about the nature of the picture. It is one with which you can laugh—with its own impudence toward foreign crises—while laughing at its rowdy spinning jokes.

Time magazine called it a "yell-mell, hard-sell, Sennett-with-a-sound-track satire of iron curtains and color lines, of people's demockeracy, Coca-Colonization, peaceful , and the Deep Southern concept that all facilities are created separate but equal."  Time notes Wilder "purposely neglects the high precision of hilarity that made Some Like It Hot a screwball classic and The Apartment a peerless comedy of officemanship. But in the rapid, brutal, whambam style of a man swatting flies with a pile driver, he has produced a sometimes , often wonderfully funny exercise in nonstop nuttiness." The film won kudos from the staff at Variety. They wrote, "Billy Wilder's One, Two, Three is a fast-paced, high-pitched, hard-hitting, lighthearted farce crammed with topical gags and spiced with satirical overtones. Story is so furiously quick-witted that some of its wit gets snarled and smothered in overlap. But total experience packs a considerable wallop."

According to J. Hoberman, screenwriter Abby Mann (who wrote Judgment at Nuremberg) "deemed Wilder's [film] so tasteless, he felt obliged to apologize for it at the Moscow Film Festival."

Box office
One, Two, Three did not do well at either the U.S. or German box office. The lighthearted East-West Berlin story felt much more sinister at the release, since the Berlin Wall had been built after principal photography began. It earned rentals over $2 million in the US and Canada. 

The film recorded a loss of $1.6 million. However, it was re-released in 1985 in France and West Germany and became a box office success, especially in West Berlin.

Censorship
One, Two, Three was banned in Finland, which had a policy of Finlandization, from 1962 to 1986 on "political" grounds — it was feared that the film would harm relations between Finland and the Soviet Union. United Pictures Finland tried to get the film released theatrically in 1962, 1966 and 1969 but it was only in 1986 that the Finnish Board of Film Classification allowed the film to be distributed.

Awards
Nominations
 Academy Awards: Oscar, Best Cinematography, Black-and-White, Daniel L. Fapp; 1962.
 Golden Globes: Golden Globe, Best Motion Picture – Comedy; Best Supporting Actress, Pamela Tiffin; 1962.
 Laurel Awards: Golden Laurel, Top Comedy, 4th place; Top Male Comedy Performance, James Cagney, 4th place; 1962.
 Writers Guild of America Awards: Best Written American Comedy (Screen), Billy Wilder and I.A.L. Diamond; 1962.

Homages and references
 The film makes several references to Cagney's earlier films, including a Cagney impression from Red Buttons, and the grapefruit-to-the-face incident from The Public Enemy. Additionally, the cuckoo clock in MacNamara's office plays "Yankee Doodle Dandy". Cagney also refers to his contemporary Edward G. Robinson by using Robinson's line "Mother of Mercy, is this the end of Rico?" from Little Caesar, which was a competitor of The Public Enemy.
 The Cold War is referenced, with one joke spoken by an apparatchik seeming to foreshadow the Cuban Missile Crisis: "We have trade agreement with Cuba: they send us cigars, we send them rockets." When Cagney's character retorts that they are "pretty crummy cigars," the Russian replies that they send the Cubans "pretty crummy rockets."
 Cagney noted that he quit Hollywood after this film due to fatigue from an inordinate number of lines in a lengthy movie helmed by a demanding Wilder and to a feeling of jealousy when he heard from a friend about to set off on a leisurely yachting trip.
 In the 2015 Steven Spielberg-directed film about an incident in the cold war, Bridge of Spies, there is a scene with a Berlin movie-house showing the film Eins, Zwei, Drei in the background.

Re-releases
One, Two, Three aired on The ABC Sunday Night Movie on 31 January 1965. It was received enthusiastically in Germany upon its 1985 re-release in cinemas. One, Two, Three was given a grand re-première at a large outdoor showing in West Berlin which was broadcast simultaneously on television. The film went on to spend a year in West Berlin cinemas, where it was rediscovered by West Berlin citizens.

See also
 List of American films of 1961

References

External links

 
 
 

1961 films
1961 comedy films
1960s English-language films
1960s political comedy films
1960s satirical films
American black-and-white films
American political comedy films
American satirical films
Coca-Cola in popular culture
Cold War films
Defection in fiction
Films based on works by Ferenc Molnár
Films directed by Billy Wilder
Films scored by André Previn
Films set in Berlin
Films shot in Berlin
Films shot in Munich
Films shot at Bavaria Studios
Films with screenplays by Billy Wilder
Films with screenplays by I. A. L. Diamond
United Artists films
Films set in West Germany
Films set in East Germany
1960s American films